Bulling, Bull polishing, spit polishing or spit shining is a term commonly used by soldiers and refers to a method for polishing leather products in such a way as to give an extremely high shine effect. The term 'Bulling' is a reference to any form of cleaning, shining, polishing or such that has no other practical application other than to present an image of exemplary turn out or cleanliness. The term 'Bulling' is an acknowledgment that this is an undertaking intended to 'Bullshit' the inspector of a cleaned item in regard to its normal state of presentation.

It is commonly used in the military as a traditional method of presenting leather accessories (such as a Sam Browne belt) and boots for inspection.  The finished effect should leave the surface of the leather highly reflective, similar to a patent leather finish. It is not unusual for soldiers to maintain a separate and unique pair of boots intended only for use for inspection or very special ceremonial occasions.

Ultimately, the process involves polishing the applied thin layers of polish, not the leather itself.  The process can be lengthy and is best learned and perfected with practice. Soldiers are highly competitive in producing the smoothest, shiniest and most durable finish possible normally to their 'Drill' or 'Parade' boots.

The down side to this method is that the slightest touch to the laminated layers of brittle dry polish could end up with them cracking or even shattering like glass or even the leather breaking up as the nourishment supplied by the oils in the polish never actually reach the leather.

References

Military uniforms
Military boots